James Benjamin Nelson (born April 1, 1941) is a former American football halfback and defensive back. He played one season for the AFL's Houston Oilers in 1964. Nelson was co-captain on the 1963 Alabama Crimson Tide football team.

who Forrest Gump portrays as the Alabama half back who made the 1963 all American team.

References 

1941 births
Living people
Sportspeople from Huntsville, Alabama
American football halfbacks
American football defensive backs
Alabama Crimson Tide football players
Houston Oilers players
Players of American football from Alabama
American Football League players